The Kihawahine (or Mo`o) - deities Kū , Kāne, Lono and Kanaloa are often referred to as the “four main gods” in traditional Hawaiian society, characterized with the incredible power and central role of female deities. Kihawahine Mokuhinia Kalama‘ula Kalā‘aiheana was the daughter of the powerful sixteenth-century ruling chief of Māui, Pi‘ilani and his wife Lā‘ieloheloheikawai. Kihawahine's  home is Mokuhinia (island in this fresh-water, spring-fed pond whose elevation was only about one meter above sea level) considered as capital of the Hawaiian kingdom, a pond in Lahaina. Kihawahine is described as a woman, a giant black lizard, or a dragon with red or auburn hair. She may be missing an eye, lost in a battle with Haumea. Kihawahine is the oldest Aumakua or spiritual helper in Polynesia.

The war between Kihawahine and Haumea
Kihawahine and Haumea both were goddesses worshiped in Hawaiian temples. The war between the two goddesses begins because the nine want to marry Puna, the chief of Oahu. While touring the island, in search of a suitable place for surf, Puna is dined by following Kihawahine far from the island. The goddess dragon, shows me the perfect spot for surfing outside the reef near the island. The two stay a long time living in a cave. The goddess cares for her beloved, but nevertheless, he is a prisoner there and knows that if he tries to escape, he will be destroyed by Kihawahine. For a long time, the goddess does not let Puna go to the ocean, but after many requests from him, she graces one day and lets him go there. One day with a clever plan, Puna manages to escape the fights and returns to his first wife Haumea in Oahu, and for a long time they lived happily ever after. One day, while Haumea was out hunting for crabs in the sea, her husband was waiting for her, resting on a banana plantation that was owned by the island's new chief Kou. Puna was killed after being taken to Kou by the watchman of the plantation. The slain is hanged on the tree when his wife - Haumea learns about it, she orders the tree to be open and her body to be there, close to Puna.

See also
 Tūmatauenga, Māori war deity.

References

Hawaiian goddesses